3% is a Brazilian web television series produced by Netflix and aired in 33 episodes over four seasons between November 2016 and August 2020. Following are lists of seasons and episodes.

Seasons

Episodes

Season 1 (2016)

Season 2 (2018)

Season 3 (2019)

Season 4 (2020)

References

External links

Lists of Brazilian television series episodes
Lists of web series episodes